Mohnyin (Shan:မိူင်းယၢင်း) is a town in Kachin State, Myanmar. It is the administrative center for both Mohnyin Township and Mohnyin District and it has a population of 33,290.

History
The town of Mohnyin was the capital of Mongyang State, also known as Möngyang (Mohnyin), one of the outlying Shan States that was extinguished in 1604.

Shells of different sizes were found in mass on 19 September. Those were found in apple-pie order while rooting up a tree between Mohnyin District Court and the Township General Administration Department. From 19 to 24 October, 3,916 shells of 11 kinds have been dig out from about three feet deep in the ground.

References

External links
Satellite map at Maplandia.com
"Mohnyin, Burma" Falling Rain Genomics, Inc.

Populated places in Kachin State
Township capitals of Myanmar